Kuldip Singh (1934 – 10 November 2020) was an Indian architect and urban planner known for his brutalist architecture designs.

Singh was born in Simla in 1934. He received the Bachelor of Architecture degree from the Delhi Polytechnic School in 1951. He was one of many young architects who worked on the Chandigarh Capitol Complex.

He designed the National Cooperative Development Corporation building, and the Palika Kendra for the New Delhi Municipal Council.

See also 
 Jugal Kishore Choudhury
 Shiv Nath Prasad
 Mahendra Raj

References

External links 

20th-century Indian architects
1934 births
2020 deaths
Brutalist architects
Indian urban planners
People from Shimla